More Than Real (foaled on April 15, 2008) is an American Thoroughbred racehorse.
Out of the mare Miss Seffens, More Than Real was sired by More Than Ready. She is owned by Bobby Flay and trained by Todd Pletcher. More Than Real won the Breeders' Cup Juvenile Fillies Turf, where she beat the favourite Winter Memories who finished 2nd and it was a head back to the third finisher Kathmanblu. At two she also won her maiden race and she finished 2nd in the Natalma Stakes-Gr.3. In all three of her two-year-old races she was ridden by Garret Gomez. She made her first start as a three-year-old running in the Coronation Stakes at Royal Ascot, where she finished eleventh in the field of 12 fillies. She was ridden there by Olivier Peslier for the first time.

Career statistics

References

2008 racehorse births
Thoroughbred family A1
Racehorses bred in Kentucky
Racehorses trained in the United States
Breeders' Cup Juvenile Fillies Turf winners